{{short description|Light rail station in New Taipei,0

Taipei Xiaocheng (Chinese: 台北小城站; Pinyin: Táiběi xiǎochéng zhàn) is a light rail station of the Ankeng light rail, operated by the New Taipei Metro, in Xindian, New Taipei, Taiwan.

Station overview
The station is an at-grade station with 2 side platforms. It is located on Section 2, Anyi Road, near Qiaoxin Road.

Station layout

Around the station

 Li Qing Huanghun Market
 Xindian Refuse Incineration Plant

Bus connections
Buses 779, G8, and G15 stop at this station.

History
Construction of the station started in 2014 and finished in 2022, and the station opened on February 10, 2023.

See also

 Ankeng light rail
 New Taipei Metro
 Rail transport in Taiwan

References

External links
 New Taipei Metro Corporation

 New Taipei City Department of Rapid Transit

Ankeng light rail stations